Antoine Gaubil (b. at Gaillac, Tarn, 14 July 1689; d. at Beijing, 24 July 1759) was French Jesuit missionary to China.

Life

He entered the Society of Jesus, 13 September 1704, was sent to China, where he arrived 26 June 1722. He then lived in Beijing for the rest of his life. His Chinese name was Sun Kiun-yung. （宋君榮）

He had taken Dominique Parrenin's place as head of the school in which Manchus were taught Latin, to act as interpreters in Russian affairs. Gaubil, the best astronomer and historian among the French Jesuits in China during the eighteenth century, carried on an extensive correspondence with the savants of his day, among them Fréret and Delisle.

Works

His works are numerous. Among them is "Traité de l'Astronomie Chinoise" in the "Observations mathématiques", published by Étienne Souciet (Paris, 1729–1732). From Chinese sources Gaubil translated the history of Jenghis Khan (Histoire de Gentchiscan (Paris, 1739) and part of the annals of the T'ang Dynasty (in "Mémoires concernant les Chinois". vols. XV and XVI); he also wrote a treaty on Chinese chronology (Traité de la Chronologie Chenoise, Paris, 1814), and executed a good translation of the second of the Chinese classics, the "Book of History" (Shoo-king), edited by De Guignes (Paris, 1770).

Gaubil left a great number of manuscripts now kept in the Observatory and Naval Depot (Paris) and in the British Museum (London). From three manuscript volumes kept formerly at the Ecole Sainte-Geneviève (Paris) there were published "Situation de Holin en Tartarie" (T'oung Pao, March, 1893) and "Situation du Japon et de la Corée" (T'oung Pao, March, 1898).

Abel Rémusat in "Nouveaux Mélanges Asiatiques" (II, p. 289), wrote of Gaubil:

"More productive than Parennin and Gerbillion, less systematical than Prémare and Foucquet, more conscientious than Amiot, less light-headed and enthusiastic than Cibot, he treated thoroughly, scientifically, and critically, every question he handled."

References

Attribution

People from Gaillac
1689 births
1759 deaths
18th-century French Jesuits
French Roman Catholic missionaries
French translators
French male non-fiction writers
French expatriates in China
Roman Catholic missionaries in China
Jesuit missionaries
18th-century French translators
Missionary linguists